René Fernand Alexandre Mourlon (12 May 1893 – 19 October 1977) was a French sprint runner who competed at the 1912, 1920 and 1924 Summer Olympics in the 100 m and 4×100 metre relay. He won a silver medal in the relay in 1920 and finished fifth in 1924, while failing to reach the final in other events. Nationally he won the 100 m title in 1912 and 1922. From 1939 to 1958 he served as the technical director of the French Athletics Federation. His younger brother André was also an Olympic sprinter.

References

1893 births
1977 deaths
French male sprinters
Olympic silver medalists for France
Athletes (track and field) at the 1912 Summer Olympics
Athletes (track and field) at the 1920 Summer Olympics
Athletes (track and field) at the 1924 Summer Olympics
Olympic athletes of France
Athletes from Paris
Medalists at the 1920 Summer Olympics
Olympic silver medalists in athletics (track and field)